Trinity Church and Rectory may refer to:

Canada
Trinity Church and Rectory (Kingston, New Brunswick), a National Historic Site of Canada

United States
Trinity Church and Rectory (Clarksville, Tennessee), listed on the U.S. National Register of Historic Places
Church of the Holy Trinity and Rectory (Middletown, Connecticut), listed on the U.S. National Register of Historic Places
Trinity Methodist Episcopal Church and Rectory (Poughkeepsie, New York), listed on the U.S. National Register of Historic Places

See also
Trinity Church (disambiguation)